Karl Holmeier (born 10 September 1956) is a German politician of the Christian Social Union (CSU) who served as a member of the Bundestag from the state of Bavaria from 2009 until 2021.

Political career 
Holmeier became a member of the Bundestag in the 2009 German federal election, representing the Schwandorf constituency. He was a member of the Committee on Transport and Digital Infrastructure.

In June 2020, Holmeier announced that he would not stand in the 2021 federal elections but instead resign from active politics by the end of the parliamentary term.

Political positions 
In June 2017, Holmeier voted against Germany's introduction of same-sex marriage.

References

External links 

  
 Bundestag biography 

1956 births
Living people
Members of the Bundestag for Bavaria
Members of the Bundestag 2017–2021
Members of the Bundestag 2013–2017
Members of the Bundestag 2009–2013
People from Cham (district)
Members of the Bundestag for the Christian Social Union in Bavaria